This is a list of plank roads built and operated by private companies in the U.S. state of New York, mainly in the 19th century. While most of the roads are still maintained as free public roads, some have been abandoned.

Background 
{
  "type": "ExternalData",
  "service": "page",
  "title": "New York Plank Roads.map"
}
The first plank road in the United States was the Syracuse-Central Square road. A 16.5 mile road built for $23,000 out of eight foot wide, four inch thick hemlock planks, the Syracuse-Central road was a massive success. In its first two years, 161,000 teams passing over it generated $12,900 in revenue. An 1847 report claimed that the road could generate 100 to 200 percent profit. Along the road, there were four toll booths. A vehicle that was drawn by two horses paid 1 and one-half cents per mile, one horse and rider paid half a cent, and pedestrians traveled on the road free.

After the success of the first plank road, applications to form new plank road companies poured in. By 1847, a general incorporation law was passed by the state legislature. The law made it significantly easier to form a company. The law stated that at least five people could come together and form a company with the intent to build a plank road, as long as they circulated a message in at least one newspaper in the county where the plank road would be built saying where people could buy stock. The company than had to raise at least 500 dollars per mile that the road would be built. Next, the proposed company had to draw up articles of association, elect directors according to the articles, name the company, state how long the company will continue (at most 30 years), list the company's capital, and provide in-depth information about where the road will go. The company could than petition the New York Department of State's office, and presumably get approval to form a company. In 1848, 52 companies were organized, 80 in 1849, and in the 1850s, about 200. This was significantly easier than the process before, which involved petitioning the New York State Legislature. In New York state, under the general incorporation law, from 1847 to 1854, more than 340 plank road building companies were incorporated, building about 3,500 miles of plank roads.

The New York Senate reported in 1870 that plank roads were more profitable than gravel or stone roads.

List

References

See also 
 Plank Road Boom
 List of turnpikes in New York

Plank road
Transportation in New York (state)
Roads in New York (state)